Tsvetelina Zarkova (born  in Pernik) is a Bulgarian female volleyball player. She is a member of the Bulgaria women's national volleyball team and plays for CS Știința Bacău. She was part of the Bulgarian national team at the 2014 FIVB Volleyball Women's World Championship in Italy.

Clubs
  VC Akademik Sofia
  Levski Sofia (2002–2004)
  Rote Raben Vilsbiburg (2005–2009)
  Lokomotiv Baku (2009–2010)
  VC Samorodok Khabarovsk (2010–2011)
  2004 Tomis Constanța (2011–2012)
  VK Prostějov (2012–2013)
  CS Dinamo București (2013–2014)
  CS Volei Alba-Blaj (2014–2015)
  CS Știința Bacău (2015–present)

Honours and awards

Titles
 German Championship - 2008
 German Cup - 2009
 Czech Championship - 2013
 Czech Cup - 2013
 Romanian Championship - 2012, 2015

References

External links
 Profile at FIVB
 Profile at CEV

1986 births
Living people
Bulgarian women's volleyball players
People from Pernik
Middle blockers
Expatriate volleyball players in Germany
Expatriate volleyball players in Azerbaijan
Expatriate volleyball players in Romania
Expatriate volleyball players in Russia
Expatriate volleyball players in the Czech Republic
Bulgarian expatriate sportspeople in Germany
Bulgarian expatriate sportspeople in Azerbaijan
Bulgarian expatriate sportspeople in Romania
Bulgarian expatriate sportspeople in Russia
Bulgarian expatriate sportspeople in the Czech Republic